The Nilkitkwa River is a river in northern British Columbia, Canada. It flows south into the Babine River north of Nilkitkwa Lake.

References

Rivers of British Columbia
Cassiar Land District